is a former Japanese football player.

Playing career
Yoshizaki was born in Shizuoka Prefecture on June 12, 1981. He joined J1 League club Shimizu S-Pulse based in his local from youth team in 2000. However he could not play at all in the match until 2001. In 2002, he moved to J2 League club Ventforet Kofu with Kosuke Suzuki. Although he played many matches until summer, his opportunity to play decreased from summer and he retired end of 2002 season.

Club statistics

References

External links

1981 births
Living people
Association football people from Shizuoka Prefecture
Japanese footballers
J1 League players
J2 League players
Shimizu S-Pulse players
Ventforet Kofu players
Association football midfielders